MU330 are an American ska punk band from St. Louis, Missouri, United States. Formed by students of St. Louis University High School in 1988, MU330 played a self-described brand of music called "Psycho Ska", high energy ska punk marked by manic performances and humorous, often strange lyricism. Since 1997, however, the band's musical direction has shifted towards a more melodic and lyric-driven ska/indie rock sound, a combination that's been described as "Weezer meets The Specials".

Dan Potthast (guitar/vocals), Ted Moll (drums), Chris Diebold (bass) and Robert Bell (trombone) have remained with MU330 since the band's inception, while trombonist Gerry Lundquist has been a member for over two decades. Though several different frontmen have been featured in the past, Potthast has always acted as the band's principal songwriter and lyricist.

Biography

The original members met in St. Louis University High School music class 330 (hence the name of the band).

Singer Dan Potthast has released solo work and has also started a second band The Stitch Up with former Slow Gherkin frontman James Rickman. He also started a ska/rocksteady group called "Dan P and the Bricks" along with former MU330 saxophonist, Matt Knobbe. As of 2018, Potthast is part of Jeff Rosenstock's touring band. Drummer Ted Moll has a side project band called Bagheera. Most members of MU330 have performed with Mike Park's Bruce Lee Band throughout the band's history, although Dan Potthast is the only member who has played live with The Bruce Lee Band in the past few years. MU330 continues to perform live sporadically across the United States.

Band members

Press (up to 1994)
John Kavanaugh - vocals, trumpet
Dan Potthast - vocals, guitar
Ted Moll - drums, vocals
Chris Diebold - bass
Robert Bell - trombone
Matt Knobbe - tenor saxophone

Chumps on Parade (1995-1997)
Jason Nelson - vocals
Dan Potthast - vocals, guitar
Ted Moll - drums, vocals
Chris Diebold - bass
Rob Bell - trombone
Traygen Bilsland - saxophone
Nick Baur - Trumpet

1997 - present
Dan Potthast - vocals, guitar
Ted Moll - drums, vocals
Chris Diebold - bass
Robert Bell - trombone
Gerry Lundquist - trombone

Discography

Albums

Live albums

Compilations

Singles, demos and non-album tracks

References

External links
 
 Dan Potthast's Official Website

Musical groups established in 1988
Musical groups from St. Louis
Musical quintets
American punk rock groups
American ska punk musical groups
Third-wave ska groups
Asian Man Records artists
Indie rock musical groups from Missouri